Mastixia macrocarpa is a tree in the family Nyssaceae. The specific epithet  is from the Greek meaning "large fruit".

Description

Distribution and habitat
Mastixia macrocarpa grows naturally in Malaysia's Sarawak state and the Philippines' Luzon island. Its habitat is mixed dipterocarp forests at around  altitude.

References

macrocarpa
Trees of Borneo
Flora of Sarawak
Trees of the Philippines
Flora of Luzon
Plants described in 1976
Taxonomy articles created by Polbot